is a song by Japanese pop singer LiSA from her fifth studio album Leo-Nine. It was released as her fifteenth single digitally on April 22, 2019, and received a physical release on July 3, 2019. Commercially, the single peaked at number three on the Oricon Singles Chart, and number two on Billboard Japan Hot 100. It was used as the first opening theme song for the hit anime series Demon Slayer: Kimetsu no Yaiba.

Background and release

On 24 March 2019, the official website of the anime Demon Slayer: Kimetsu no Yaiba revealed the opening theme song "Gurenge" that would be sung by LiSA. The song was released digitally on April 22, 2019, and received a physical single on July 3, 2019, on three editions; regular, limited, and limited anime edition. The song was featured live on YouTube channel The First Take and also on 2019 Kōhaku Uta Gassen. The song also featured in her fifth album Leo-Nine.

Reception

"Gurenge" won a Newtype Anime Awards for 2019 best theme song, and won on 34th Japan Gold Disc Award for Best 5 Songs by Download. The song has been covered by people across the world on YouTube. One of them was the Japanese duo Garnidelia, who made a self cover of the song in their official YouTube; the cover is part of their official cover, titled Garnidelia Cover Collection. An instrumental rendition of the song was featured during the closing ceremony of the 2020 Tokyo Olympics.

Commercial performance

"Gurenge" reached number three on the Oricon Singles Chart, two on the Billboard Japan Hot 100, and one on the Japan Hot Animation. In May 2019, "Gurenge" was certified gold by the Recording Industry Association of Japan (RIAJ) for 100,000 full-track digital music downloads.

In July 2020, "Gurenge" was certified million by the Recording Industry Association of Japan (RIAJ) for 1,000,000 full-track digital music downloads. "Gurenge" became the first single by female artist to surpass 1 million downloads in the history of Oricon Digital Single Chart. The single also become the third overall single in the chart's history to do so, after Kenshi Yonezu's 2018 single "Lemon", and his 2019 single "Uma to Shika".

Music video

The music video for "Gurenge" was directed by Masakazu Fukatsu. and produced by Hiroshi Takayama. The video features LiSA using red scarf & black cloth as motifs, wearing a white sleeveless shirt and red shorts, dancing alongside two demons. Sometimes the scenes would show the demons with black and red effect. The video ends with LiSA donning a demon mask. The demons are played by Shinji Kanazawa and Mai Shimizu.

Track listing

Personnel
Musicians
LiSA – vocals, lyrics (1)
Toru Hidaka – lyrics (2)
Tomoya Tabuchi – lyrics (3), composition (3)
Kayoko Kusano – composition (1)
Yuichi Takama – bass
Pablo – composition (2), arrangement (2), guitar
Osamu Hidai – drums
Ryo Eguchi – arrangement (1, 3), other instruments

Production
Yasuhisa Kataoka, Hiromitsu Takasu – recording
Yasuhisa Kataoka – mixing
Taisuke Uchino – assistant
Akihiro Shiba, Temas – mastering

Accolades

Charts

Weekly charts

Year-end charts

Certifications

Release history

References

LiSA (Japanese musician, born 1987) songs
2019 singles
2019 songs
Anime songs
Demon Slayer: Kimetsu no Yaiba
Songs written by LiSA (Japanese musician, born 1987)